Partido Acción Nacional may refer to:

 National Action Party (Chile)
 National Action Party (El Salvador)
 National Action Party (Guatemala)
 National Action Party (Mexico)
 National Action Party (Nicaragua)